The Prix Saint-Roman was a Group 3 flat horse race in France open to two-year-old thoroughbreds. For much of its history it was run at Longchamp over a distance of 1,800 metres (about 1⅛ miles), and it was scheduled to take place each year in late September or early October.

History
During the 1890s and early 1900s, the event was a 3,000-metre race for older horses. It was staged in early October, on the same day as the Prix du Conseil Municipal.

The Prix Saint-Roman was restricted to two-year-olds and cut to 1,800 metres in 1907. It became part of the Prix de l'Arc de Triomphe meeting in 1920.

The present system of race grading was introduced in 1971, and the Prix Saint-Roman was classed at Group 3 level.

The race was moved to the week before the Prix de l'Arc de Triomphe in 1989. It was transferred to Évry in 1991, and switched to November in 1994. It was relocated to Saint-Cloud and shortened to 1,600 metres in 1997.

The Prix Saint-Roman was closed to colts and geldings in 1998. It continued as a fillies' race until 2000. It was replaced the following year by the Prix Miesque, a Group 3 race at Maisons-Laffitte.

Records
Leading jockey since 1977 (4 wins):
 Freddy Head – Trigonome (1981), Saint Cyrien (1982), Truculent (1983), Tagel (1988)

Leading trainer since 1977 (4 wins):
 François Boutin – Corvaro (1979), Blushing John (1987), Tagel (1988), Zindari (1993)

Leading owner since 1977 (2 wins):
 Paul de Moussac – Noir et Or (1977), Pigeon Voyageur (1990)
 Sheikh Mohammed – Conmaiche (1986), Richard of York (1992)
 Allen Paulson – Blushing John (1987), Tagel (1988)

Winners since 1977

Earlier winners
 1894: Blandy
 1895: Sterlet
 1896: Mamiano
 1897: Arlequin
 1898: Bonnet Vert
 1899: Little Monarque
 1900: Kroshka
 1901: Alba
 1902: Monoeci Arx
 1903: Fanion
 1904: Apanage
 1905: Marsan
 1906: Pois Rouges
 1907: Quintette
 1908: Reyna
 1909: Coquille
 1910: Grand Seigneur / Lahire *
 1911: Romagny
 1912: Amadou
 1913: Frileux
 1917: Spring Cleaning
 1919: Strepera

 1920: Soldat
 1921: Kefalin
 1922: Massine
 1923: Isola Bella
 1924: Eleusis
 1925: Baltique
 1926: Flamant
 1927: Kerka
 1928: Grock
 1929: La Savoyarde
 1930: Farnus
 1931: Agnello
 1932: Sunny Boy
 1934: Chasse Neige
 1935: Horncastle
 1936: Gonfalonier
 1937: Pylos
 1938: Galerien
 1940: Le Marmot
 1941: Salmiana
 1942: Bambou
 1943: La Bagatelle

 1947: Rigolo
 1948: Coast Guard
 1951: Silnet
 1952: Fort de France
 1953: Beigler Bey
 1956: Amber
 1957: Lackawanna
 1959: Mincio
 1960: Tchita
 1962: Chutney
 1963: Michilimackinac
 1965: War Paint
 1966: Timour
 1968: Prince Regent
 1969: Ananndpour
 1970: Sharapour
 1971: Neptunium
 1972: Vexin
 1973: Riverton
 1974: Bold Pirate
 1975: Far North
 1976: Balteus

* The 1910 race was a dead-heat and has joint winners.

See also
 List of French flat horse races

References

 France Galop / Racing Post:
 , 

 galopp-sieger.de – Prix Miesque (ex Prix Saint-Roman).
 pedigreequery.com – Prix Saint-Roman (Prix Miesque).

Horse races in France
Flat horse races for two-year-olds
Discontinued horse races